Web buttons, badges or stickers are small images in some World Wide Web pages which are typically used to promote programs that were used to create or host the site (for example, MediaWiki sites often have a "Powered by Mediawiki" button on the bottom right corner of the page). They may also be used to promote compliance with web standards such as passing World Wide Web Consortium (W3C) HTML validation or to comply with an application's terms of service.

These were first popularized as "Best viewed in..." buttons by Netscape and Microsoft during the browser wars.

External links
, web badges generator tool based on Antipixel's
Silkscreen, font often used in Web badges
Makebutton.com, Make your own free web buttons and banners with an online tool
lifehacker.com: Create your own web buttons, 11 May 2007
Steal These Buttons, a collection of over 3700 buttons since 2003

Web design
Computer icons